In Peaceful Time is a 1950 Soviet action film directed by Vladimir Braun.

Plot 
The film tells about the life of submariners in peacetime. At first glance, everything is fine and peaceful, but everything changed as soon as military exercises began. As it turned out, foreign intelligence wants at any cost to obtain secret information from Soviet submariners.

Cast
 Nikolai Timofeyev	as Afanasy	
 Arkadi Tolbuzin as Georgy Orlov
 Aleksandr Grechany	as   midshipman
 Sergei Gurzo as Pavlo Panychuk
 Andrei Sova as Suchkov
 Vyacheslav Tikhonov as Grinevsky
 Karaman Mgeladze as Vakhtang Meskhishvili
 Georgi Yumatov as sailor Kurakin
 Dmitry Kostenko as sailor Pivovarov
 Viktor Avdyushko as Stepan Matveyev, diver
 Viktor Dobrovolsky as admiral
 Viktor Mironov as Ilin, Captain I Rank  
 Leonid Kmit	as 	chief of staff
 Elina Bystritskaya as Lena
 Veronika Vasilyeva as Zina
 Mikhail Gluzsky as duty midshipman

Release 
Vladimir Braun's film   takes the 720th place in the list of most popular box-office films of the Soviet distribution. It was watched by 23.5 million viewers.

References

External links 
 

1950 films
1950s Russian-language films
Dovzhenko Film Studios films
Submarine films
Soviet action films
1950s action films
Films scored by Yuliy Meitus